The Federal Department of Defence, Civil Protection and Sport (DDPS) is one of the seven departments of the Swiss federal government. It is headed by a member of the Swiss Federal Council, the Swiss defence minister.

Organisation
The department is composed of the following departmental sectors:

 General Secretariat
 Swiss Armed Forces
 Land Forces
 Air Force
 Armed Forces Logistics Organisation
 Armed Forces Command Support Organisation
 Federal Office for Civil Protection
 Coordination of the civil protection services of the cantons and municipalities
 National Emergency Operations Centre
 Spiez Laboratory, responsible for weapons of mass destruction research and protection
 Federal Office of Sport
 Responsible for sport policy, the National Youth Sports Centre Tenero and the Youth and Sport organisation.
 Federal Office for Defence Procurement
 Federal Office of Topography (Swisstopo)
 Office of the Military Attorney General: The military prosecutor's office.
 Federal Intelligence Service (FIS): Switzerland's civil intelligence service.

Name of department
1848: Military Department
 1979: Federal Military Department
 Since 1998: Federal Department of Defence, Civil Protection and Sport

List of heads of the department

See also
Sport in Switzerland

Notes and references

External links
Official website

Switzerland
Defence, Civil Protection and Sport
 
Military of Switzerland
Defence ministries
Sport in Switzerland
1848 establishments in Switzerland